Coleophora arachnias is a moth of the family Coleophoridae. It is found in Iran, Afghanistan, Iran, Turkmenistan, Saudi Arabia, the Palestinian Territories and Oman.

References

arachnias
Moths described in 1922
Moths of the Middle East
Insects of the Arabian Peninsula